The 1922 Major League Baseball season was contested from April 12 to October 8, 1922. The New York Giants and New York Yankees were the regular season champions of the National League and American League, respectively. The Giants then defeated the Yankees in the World Series, four games to none.

This was the first of eight seasons that "League Awards", a precursor to the Major League Baseball Most Valuable Player Award (introduced in 1931), were issued. Only an American League award was given in 1922.

Standings

American League

National League

Postseason

Bracket

Statistical leaders

Managers

American League

National League

Home Field Advantage

Notable Occurrences
April 29 – the New York Giants hit four inside-the-park home runs during a 15–4 victory over the Boston Braves.
July 12 – the Cleveland Indians defeat the Boston Red Sox 11–7, with all 20 of the Indians' hits being singles.

July 13 – the Boston Red Sox defeat the St Louis Browns 2–0 in front of only 68 spectators, which is the smallest crowd in the history of Fenway Park.

References

External links
1922 Major League Baseball season schedule at Baseball Reference

 
Major League Baseball seasons